Vasos Vacíos (Spanish for "Empty Glasses") is the 8th album by Argentine rock, ska, and reggae band Los Fabulosos Cadillacs. This album, released in 1993, was a compilation album which included tracks from the band's previous seven albums (1986–1992). This album also contained new arrangements of previous songs, and new songs such as "El Matador".

This album earned a Gold Album from Argentine Chamber of Phonograms and Videograms Producers (CAPIF). The Gold Album honor is given when an album sells more than 30,000 units. The band later appeared on the first Latin MTV Unplugged.

Reception
The Allmusic review by Victor W. Valdivia awarded the album 4.5 stars out of 5, stating:
"One of the new tracks, 'El Matador' became an instant smash hit on the newly launched MTV Latino, and deservedly so as the song comes on like a thundering locomotive. The other new track, 'V Centenario' is an assault on colonialism that's almost as forceful. Similarly, the re-recorded earlier hits, such as 'El Satanico Dr. Cadillac' and 'Gitana' are delivered with far more energy and muscle than the original versions. Clearly, by this time, the band had become a more confident and cohesive unit. Vasos Vacios is an excellent introduction to the band's unique style."

Track listing

Personnel 

 Vicentico – Vocals
 Flavio Cianciarulo – bass
 Anibal Rigozzi – Guitar
 Mario Siperman – keyboards
 Fernando Ricciardi – drums
 Sergio Rotman – Alto saxophone
 Daniel Lozano – Trumpet & flugelhorn
 Fernando Albareda – Trombone
 Gerardo Rotblat – percussion

External links
Los Fabulosos Cadillacs Official Web Site
Vasos Vacíos at MusicBrainz
[ Vasos Vacíos] at Allmusic
Vasos Vacíos at Discogs

References 

Los Fabulosos Cadillacs albums
1993 compilation albums
Sony Music Argentina compilation albums